Emil Petrunov (born 6 June 1955) is a Bulgarian judoka. He competed in the men's heavyweight event at the 1976 Summer Olympics.

References

1955 births
Living people
Bulgarian male judoka
Olympic judoka of Bulgaria
Judoka at the 1976 Summer Olympics
Place of birth missing (living people)